José Ferrer (1912–1992) was a Puerto Rican actor, theater and film director.

José Ferrer may also refer to:
 José C. Ferrer (born 1964), American jockey
 José Ferrer (bobsleigh) (born 1965), Puerto Rican Olympic bobsledder
 José Ferrer (guitarist) (1835–1916), Spanish guitarist and composer
 José Ferrer (Puerto Rican footballer) (born 1996), Puerto Rican football player
 José Ferrer Canales (1913–2005), Puerto Rican educator, writer and pro-independence political activist
 José Ferrer de Couto (1820–1877), Spanish journalist
 José Ferrer (Spanish footballer) (born 1950), retired Spanish footballer 
 José Figueres Ferrer (1906–1990), president of Costa Rica
 José Joaquín de Ferrer (1763–1818), Spanish Basque astronomer
 José Ramón Ferrer (born 1968), Mexican sprint canoer
 José Daniel Ferrer (born 1970), Cuban human rights activist
 José Ferrer (baseball), baseball player